Venancio P. Ziga (1945–2021) was a Filipino politician, and former Governor of Albay province in the Philippines.

Ziga was born in Manila on September 30, 1945.

He is the husband of Senator Tecla San Andres Ziga, a public servant and lawyer. They have only one son, Victor Ziga who were later elected as a Senator of the Republic of the Philippines.

References

External links

1945 births
2021 deaths
Filipino politicians
Governors of Albay